Following are lists of notable Arabic dictionaries.

Explanatory dictionaries

Bilingual dictionaries

Influential Arabic dictionaries in Europe:
 Pedro de Alcalá, Vocabulista, 1505. A Spanish-Arabic glossary in transcription only.
 Valentin Schindler, Lexicon Pentaglotton: Hebraicum, Chaldicum, Syriacum, Talmudico-Rabbinicum, et Arabicum, 1612. Arabic lemmas were printed in Hebrew characters.
 Franciscus Raphelengius, Lexicon Arabicum, Leiden 1613. The first printed dictionary of the Arabic language in Arabic characters.
 Jacobus Golius, Lexicon Arabico-Latinum, Leiden 1653. The dominant Arabic dictionary in Europe for almost two centuries.
 Georg Freytag, Lexicon Arabico-Latinum, praesertim ex Djeuharii Firuzubadiique et aliorum libris confectum I–IV, Halle 1830–1837
 Edward William Lane, Arabic–English Lexicon, 8 vols, London-Edinburgh 1863–1893. Highly influential, but incomplete (stops at Kaf)

Influential Arabic dictionaries in modern usage:
 German (Classical Arabic): M. Ullmann, Wörterbuch der klassischen arabischen Sprache I, kāf, Wiesbaden 1970; II/1-4, lām, Wiesbaden 1984–2009. Missing mīm, nūn, hā’, wāw, and yā’.
 German (Modern Standard Arabic): Hans Wehr, Arabisches Wörterbuch für die Schriftsprache der Gegenwart. Arabisch-Deutsch, Wiesbaden 1952; 5th ed., 1985.
 English (translation of Hans Wehr): J Milton Cowan: Dictionary of Modern Written Arabic. Arabic-English, Wiesbaden 1971; 4th ed., 1979.
 French: R. Blachère, C. Pellat, M. Chouémi, and C. Denizeau, Dictionnaire arabe-français-anglais (langues classique et moderne), Paris 1963 ff.
 Russian: Х.К. Баранов, Арабско-русский словарь, Moscow 1957; 6th ed., 1985.
 Polish: J. Kozłowska and J. Danecki, Słownik arabsko-polski, Warszawa 1996 and J. Łacina, Słownik arabsko-polski, Poznań 1997.
 Greek: G. Endress (ed.), A Greek and Arabic Lexicon, Leiden 1992 ff.

See also
Dictionary
List of Dutch dictionaries
List of French dictionaries
List of German dictionaries
Dictionary of Modern Written Arabic (Arabic-English/German dictionary)
List of Arabic encyclopedias

Notes

References 

Arabic language
Arabic dictionaries